Prodentobunus is a genus of harvestmen in the family Sclerosomatidae from Asia.

Species
 Prodentobunus unispinosus (Roewer, 1912)
 Prodentobunus luteus Suzuki, 1977
 Prodentobunus nitidus Roewer, 1955
 Prodentobunus tao Roewer, 1955

References

Harvestmen
Harvestman genera